The following is a list of New Zealand inventors and inventions.

 Godfrey Bowen – developer of an improved sheep-shearing technique
 John Britten – designer of the Britten motorcycle
 Thomas Brydone and William Soltau Davidson – refrigerated shipping pioneers
 Morton Coutts – invented the revolutionary continuous fermentation method of brewing
 Bill Gallagher – developer of the electric fence and founder of Gallagher Group Limited
 A J Hackett – creator of commercial Bungy jumping
 Bill Hamilton – developed the modern jetboat
 Frederick Melrose Horowhenua Hanson – inventor of chipseal, known in New Zealand as tar seal
 Peter Lynn – leading kitemaker, aeronautical theoretician and inventor of the tipping blade portable sawmill
 Colin Murdoch – inventor of the disposable syringe and the tranquilliser gun
 Richard Pearse – aviation pioneer
 Bill Pickering (rocket scientist) – rocketry and space pioneer, former NASA Jet Propulsion Lab director
 Alan Prichard – pioneer of aerial topdressing
 Bill Robinson (scientist) – inventor of the lead rubber bearing used for seismic base isolation in earthquake engineering

References

Inventors
 
Lists of inventors
Inventors